August 26 - Eastern Orthodox liturgical calendar - August 28

All fixed commemorations below are observed on September 9 by Eastern Orthodox Churches on the Old Calendar.

For August 27, Orthodox Churches on the Old Calendar commemorate the Saints listed on August 14.

Saints

 Saint Hosius the Confessor (Osius or Ossius), Bishop of Cordova (359)
 Saint Liberius the Confessor, Pope of Rome (366)
 Saint Arcadius, Eastern Roman Emperor (395-408)
 Saint Praulius, Archbishop of Jerusalem (422)
 Venerable Poemen the Great, of Egypt (450)
 Saint Sabbas, monk, of Benephali.
 Saint Poemen of Palestine (605)
 Great-martyr Phanourios the Newly-Revealed, of Rhodes.
 Martyr Anthousa the New, by drowning in a well.
 Venerable Theoklitos, a Magistros from Constantinople who retired from the world and took the monastic habit, becoming an ascetic on Mt. Olympos.

Pre-Schism Western saints

 Virgin-martyr Euthalia, in Leontini in Sicily (252)  (see also: March 2 - East)
 Martyrs Rufus and Carpophorus (Carpone), Martyrs in Capua under Diocletian (295)
 Saint Rufus of Capua, Bishop of Capua and disciple of St Apollinaris of Ravenna.
 Saint Narnus, first Bishop of Bergamo in Italy.
 Saint Monica of Hippo  (Monica of Tagaste) (387)  (see also: May 4 - East )
 Saint Caesarius of Arles, Bishop of Arles (543)
 Saint Licerius (Lizier), Bishop of Couserans (c. 548)
 Saint Syagrius (Siacre), Bishop of Autun and Confessor (600)
 Saint Etherius (Alermius), Bishop of Lyons (602)
 Saint Decuman of Watchet (Dagan) (706)
 Saint Ebbo, Bishop of Sens (740)
 Saint John of Pavia, Bishop of Pavia in Lombardy (813)
 Saint Agilo, Monk of St Aper in Toul in France (957)
 Saint Gebhard of Constance, Bishop of Constance in Germany (995)
 Saint Malrubius, an hermit in Merns in Kincardineshire in Scotland, martyred by Norwegian invaders (c. 1040)

Post-Schism Orthodox saints

 Hieromartyr Kuksha and St. Pimen the Faster, of the Near Caves in Kiev (after 1114)

New martyrs and confessors

 New Hieromartyrs Michael Voskresensky, Priest, (with 28 other martyrs), and Stephen Nemkov, Priest, (with 18 other martyrs), all of Nizhni-Novgorod (1918)
 New Hieromartyrs John Lebedev and John Smirnov, Priests (1937)
 New Hieromartyr Methodius (Ivanov), Abbot, of Sukovo (Moscow) (1937)
 New Hieromartyr Aleksander Tsitserov, Priest (1939)
 New Hieromartyr Vladimir Sokolov, Priest (1940)
 Saint Demetrius Kryuchkov the Confessor, Priest (1952)

Other commemorations

 Baptism of the Ethiopian eunuch Djan Darada, by Saint Philip the Evangelist, in Acts 8:26-40 (1st century) (see also: January 4 and June 17)
 Uncovering of the relics (1991) of St. John Gashkevich, Archpriest, of Korma (1917)
 Slaying of Archimandrite Symeon (Kholmogorov), spiritual writer (1937)
 Repose of Archimandrite Sergius (Ozerov) of New Valaam Monastery in Siberia (1937)
 Translation of the Relics of Saints Theognostus, Cyprian and Photius, Metropolitans of Moscow.

Icon gallery

Notes

References

Sources
 August 27 / September 9. Orthodox Calendar (PRAVOSLAVIE.RU).
 September 9 / August 27. Holy Trinity Russian Orthodox Church (A parish of the Patriarchate of Moscow).
 August 27. OCA - The Lives of the Saints.
 The Autonomous Orthodox Metropolia of Western Europe and the Americas (ROCOR). St. Hilarion Calendar of Saints for the year of our Lord 2004. St. Hilarion Press (Austin, TX). p. 63.
 The Twenty-Seventh Day of the Month of August. Orthodoxy in China.
 August 27. Latin Saints of the Orthodox Patriarchate of Rome.
 The Roman Martyrology. Transl. by the Archbishop of Baltimore. Last Edition, According to the Copy Printed at Rome in 1914. Revised Edition, with the Imprimatur of His Eminence Cardinal Gibbons. Baltimore: John Murphy Company, 1916. pp. 259–260.
 Rev. Richard Stanton. A Menology of England and Wales, or, Brief Memorials of the Ancient British and English Saints Arranged According to the Calendar, Together with the Martyrs of the 16th and 17th Centuries. London: Burns & Oates, 1892. pp. 414–418.

 Greek Sources
 Great Synaxaristes:  27 ΑΥΓΟΥΣΤΟΥ. ΜΕΓΑΣ ΣΥΝΑΞΑΡΙΣΤΗΣ.
  Συναξαριστής. 27 Αυγούστου. ECCLESIA.GR. (H ΕΚΚΛΗΣΙΑ ΤΗΣ ΕΛΛΑΔΟΣ).

 Russian Sources
  9 сентября (27 августа). Православная Энциклопедия под редакцией Патриарха Московского и всея Руси Кирилла (электронная версия). (Orthodox Encyclopedia - Pravenc.ru).

August in the Eastern Orthodox calendar